Alexandru Terheș (born 25 July 1960) is a Romanian former football player, who currently works for FRF.

He played for Minerul Cavnic, Baia Mare, Sportul Studențesc, Brașov and Bihor Oradea.

Terheş won 2 caps for Romania in 1978 against Poland, in 1979 against East Germany. In 1980 he played for Romania's Olympic team against Hungary.

Honours
FC Baia Mare
Liga II: 1977–78

References

External links
 
 

1960 births
Living people
Sportspeople from Baia Mare
Romanian footballers
Romania international footballers
Association football forwards
Liga I players
Liga II players
CS Minaur Baia Mare (football) players
FC Sportul Studențesc București players
FC Brașov (1936) players
FC Bihor Oradea players